Made in England is the twenty-fourth studio album by English musician Elton John, released in 1995. It was produced by John and Greg Penny, the first time since Leather Jackets without Chris Thomas. The album was dedicated to John's boyfriend and future husband David Furnish. It was also dedicated to the memory of Denis Gauthier and Peter Williams. It was the last album to feature regular percussionist Ray Cooper until 2016's Wonderful Crazy Night. Bob Birch became John's full-time recording and touring bass player and continued that role until his death in 2012.

The song "Please" was covered by bluegrass singer Rhonda Vincent and country singer Dolly Parton for the 2018 tribute album Restoration: Reimagining the Songs of Elton John and Bernie Taupin.

Background
While still promoting his work for The Lion King soundtrack, in September 1994, five months before its release as a single, Elton John debuted "Believe" during the opening night of a concert tour with Ray Cooper in Phoenix, AZ. "Believe" reached No. 15 in the UK and No. 13 in the US, and was the only American hit from the album to reach the top 20. During November, John toured Brazil, Argentina, Chile, Peru, Switzerland, Poland, France, Italy, the UK, and Japan, and other countries two months later. Several songs from the album made it to the tour's playlist, including "Believe", "Made in England", "House", "Blessed", "Lies" and "Pain".

A few special notes about some of the songs: on "Belfast", the song originally ended simply with John singing the last line, "Belfast". In an interview with fan magazine East End Lights some time later, arranger Paul Buckmaster (in his first project with John since 1978's A Single Man) said he thought the song needed a more uplifting end, and added the outro, making it sound as if it were being played in an Irish pub somewhere up the road. John reportedly was initially wary of the idea, but Buckmaster said he changed his mind upon hearing it and approved the new coda for the final version; George Martin, who owned AIR Studios London where the album was recorded, wrote the horn and string arrangement on "Latitude"; and John and Guy Babylon are credited as arrangers on "Man", which also includes organ by Squeeze and Mike + The Mechanics frontman Paul Carrack.

Singles

Track listing

Outtakes
There are many outtakes from Made in England. These songs include "Building a Bird", "Leaves", "Hell", "Skin", "Tick-Tock", "Undone", "Red", "Live Like Horses", an alternate version of "Belfast", and an alternate version of "Believe". "Red" was later released on the French compilation Sol En Si, and a version of "Live Like Horses" was later released on The Big Picture. "Building a Bird" was recorded by Nigel Olsson for his 2001 Move the Universe CD, released only in Japan. "Hell" and the original cut of "Live Like Horses" have circulated on YouTube. The remaining outtakes have yet to circulate.

Personnel 
 Elton John – lead and backing vocals, acoustic piano (1-7, 9-11), harmonium (7), keyboards (8), string arrangements (9)
 Guy Babylon – keyboards, programming, backing vocals (8), string arrangements (9)
 Teddy Borowiecki – accordion (6)
 Paul Carrack – Hammond organ (9)
 Davey Johnstone – guitars, mandolin, banjo, backing vocals (8)
 Bob Birch – bass, backing vocals (8)
 Charlie Morgan – drums
 Ray Cooper – percussion
 Paul Brennan – pipes, flute (6)
 Dermont Crehan – violin (6)
 Paul Buckmaster – orchestral arrangements and conductor (1, 3, 4, 6)
 George Martin – string and French horn arrangements (7), conductor (7)
 Gavyn Wright – orchestra leader (6), conductor (9)
 The London Session Orchestra – orchestra (1, 3, 4, 6, 7, 9)

Production 
 Elton John – producer
 Greg Penny – producer, mixing
 Jon Ingoldsby – recording, mixing
 Andy Strange – assistant engineer
 Chris Bellman – mastering at Bernie Grundman Mastering (Hollywood, California).
 Adrian Collee – studio coordination
 Steve Brown – album coordination
 Pete Mills – drum and guitar technician
 Bill Harrison – percussion technician
 Greg Gorman – photography
 Wherefore Art? – design
 John Reid – management

Accolades

Grammy Awards

|-
|1996 || "Believe" || Best Pop Vocal Performance – Male || 
|-

American Music Awards

|-
| style="width:35px; text-align:center;"|1996 || Elton John (performer) || Favorite Pop/Rock Male Artist|| 
|-

Charts

Weekly charts

Year-end charts

Certifications and sales

References

External links

1995 albums
Elton John albums
Albums produced by Greg Penny
Albums produced by Elton John
Island Records albums
The Rocket Record Company albums
Albums arranged by Paul Buckmaster
Albums arranged by George Martin
Albums conducted by George Martin